Auld Lang Syne is the second studio album by the German melodic death metal band Suidakra.

Track listing 
 Auld Lang Syne - 1:38
 Hall of Tales - 5:26
 A Menhirs Clay - 4:29
 And Another Cist Looms - 5:20
 An Dùdlachd - 2:28
 Tuatha dè Danaan - 4:40
 Jeremiad - 1:35
 The Fall of Tara - 4:10
 Enticing Slumber - 6:20
 Calm... - 2:34

Personnel 
 Arkadius Antonik – lead, rhythm, melodic, acoustic guitars & main vocals
 Marcel Schoenen – melodic, acoustic guitars & clean vocals
 Christoph Zacharowski - bass
 Stefan Möller – drums
 Daniela Voigt - Keyboards and vocals
 Torsten Pätzold – engineering & mastering
 Jörg Scheibner - covert art

External links 
 Track list and lyrics on suidakra.com

1998 albums
Suidakra albums